Karri Anne Willms (born April 16, 1969) is a Canadian curler and curling coach from Vernon, British Columbia.

She won a bronze medal at the 1992 Winter Olympics when curling was a demonstration sport. She retired from curling afterwards.

In 2018 she began working for the World Curling Federation as the Competitions and Development Officer.

Personal life
Willms worked at a bank before her and husband Renato Lepore "took a break" and moved to Novara, Italy to work as mechanics on the JD Motorsport pit crew in Formula Renault racing.

Awards
STOH All-Star teams:  (lead)
British Columbia Curling Hall of Fame: 1996, together with all of the Julie Sutton 1991–1993 team.

Teams and events

Record as a coach of national teams

References

External links

 Karri Willms – Curling Canada Stats Archive
 
 
 
 Canada's Karri Willms competing in the curling event at the 1992 Albertville Olympic winter Games. (CP PHOTO/COA/Ted Grant)
 
 
 World Senior Curling Championships 2019 - Competition Officials

Living people
1969 births
Canadian women curlers
Curlers from British Columbia
Canadian women's curling champions
Curlers at the 1992 Winter Olympics
Olympic curlers of Canada
Canadian curling coaches
Sportspeople from Vernon, British Columbia
People from Novara
Canadian expatriate sportspeople in Italy
Mechanics (people)
Auto racing people
Canadian motorsport people
Sportspeople from the Province of Novara